Bathyuroconger parvibranchialis is an eel in the family Congridae (conger/garden eels). It was described by Henry Weed Fowler in 1934, originally under the genus Silvesterina. It is a marine, deep water-dwelling eel which is known from the western central Pacific Ocean. It is known to dwell at a depth of 1023 metres.

References

Congridae
Fish described in 1934